Rosine may refer to:

 Rosine (given name), list of people and fictional characters with this name 
 Rosine, a film directed by Christine Carrière awarded a César in 1996
 Rosine a song by singer Soukous and composer Aurlus Mabélé
 Rosine, Kentucky, an unincorporated town in Ohio County, United States

See also
 Dewey Avenue–West Rosine Historic District in St. Joseph, Missouri, United States
 Rosin (disambiguation)
 Rosina (disambiguation)
 Rose (disambiguation)